Ana is a Mexican comedy-drama television series created by and starring Ana de la Reguera. The series is produced by Argos Comunicación, and Viacom International Studios. It premiered on April 20, 2020 on Comedy Central, and streaming on Pantaya for the United States and Puerto Rico. Subsequently, it was made available to all Latin America in streaming in Amazon Prime Video on 21 April 2020. A total of 10 episodes were confirmed for the series. The series has two bisexual characters in the main cast and one lesbian character. In September 2021, the series was renewed for a second and third season.

Cast 
Part of the cast was confirmed on 11 March 2020 through the Excelsior newspaper.
 Ana de la Reguera as Ana
 Tina Romero as Nena
 Paulina Dávila as Chock
 Andrés Almeida as Check
 Carlos Miranda (season 1) and David Palacio (season 2) as Papasito
 Christian Meier (season 2) as Yo Mero
 Paly Duval as LatinTuber
 Tom Parker as Chic
 Ali Gardoqui as Sis
 Augusto Gardoqui as Guti
 Eduardo "Lalo" España as Manager

Awards and nominations 

|-
| align = "center" | 2021 || 32nd GLAAD Media Awards || colspan = "2" | Outstanding Spanish-Language Scripted Television Series ||  || 
|}

References 

2020 Mexican television series debuts
Spanish-language television shows
Spanish-language Amazon Prime Video original programming
Amazon Prime Video original programming
Comedy Central original programming
Mexican LGBT-related television shows
2020s comedy-drama television series
2020s Mexican drama television series
2020s Mexican comedy television series